Children of the Street (German: Kinder der Straße) is a 1929 German silent drama film directed by Carl Boese and starring Lissy Arna, Heinrich George and Rudolf Biebrach.

The film's art direction was by Karl Machus.

Cast
In alphabetical order
 Lissy Arna 
 Hannelore Benzinger
 Rudolf Biebrach
 Gerhard Dammann
 Karl Falkenberg 
 Lilly Flohr 
 Heinrich George 
 Erika Glässner 
 John Mylong 
 Martha Seemann 
 Sylvia Torf 
 Maria West

References

Bibliography
 James Robert Parish & Kingsley Canham. Film Directors Guide: Western Europe. Scarecrow Press, 1976.

External links

1929 films
Films of the Weimar Republic
Films directed by Carl Boese
German silent feature films
National Film films
German black-and-white films
1929 drama films
German drama films